The Civil Police founded on January 1, 1945, is one of the law enforcement organisations in San Marino, who police one of the smallest, but perhaps one of the safest countries in the world. In 2011, only one prisoner was incarcerated, making San Marino the least incarcerated country in the world. The Secretary of State of Home Affairs controls the Civil Police, who are responsible for tax collection, domestic security, traffic control, and civil defence. Currently there are around 50 police officers and civilian employees serving in the Civil Police, according to a report by the Government of San Marino. The Civil Police are required by statute to cooperate with two military units, the Gendarmerie and the Fortress Guard, who are responsible (from new regulations passed in 2008) for policing, criminal investigation, national penitentiary, changing the guard, border patrol, customs control, personal protection, and national security.

Emergencies
The national emergency telephone number, for the police is 112, for the Fire Brigade is 115, and for the Ambulance Service is 118.

Ranks
Senior Officers
Commandant
Officer - (There are two , one of whom is the Vice Commandant)

NCOs
Inspector
Superintendent

Agents
Assistant
Chosen Agent
Agent
Auxiliary Agent

Equipment 

The Civil Police maintain a fleet of 33 vehicles, including: 4 Alfa Romeo 156s, 4 Piaggio Libertys, 3 Fiat Pandas, 3 Fiat Mareas, 3 Subaru Foresters, 3 Subaru Outbacks, 2 Fiat Ducatos, 2 Fiat Puntos,  2 Fiat Stilos, 2 Land Rover Defenders, 1 Iveco Baribbi, 1 Iveco Magirus, 1 Fiat Daily, 1 Ford F-250, and 1 Man TGM. Officers typically carry the Glock 17, and occasionally the Benelli M4 when patrolling. The officers wear a dark yellow shirt and black pants.

Point Duty

See also
 San Marino
Law enforcement in San Marino
Military of San Marino

References

External links

 Official website
 Interpol notes

Law enforcement in San Marino
1945 establishments in San Marino